McLouth is a city in Jefferson County, Kansas, United States.  As of the 2020 census, the population of the city was 859.

History
McLouth was founded in the 1880s. It was named for Amos McLouth, the original owner of the town site.

The first post office in McLouth was established in May 1882.

Geography
McLouth is located at  (39.195304, -95.207584).

Demographics

McLouth is part of the Topeka, Kansas Metropolitan Statistical Area.

2010 census
As of the census of 2010, there were 880 people, 341 households, and 240 families living in the city. The racial makeup of the city was 95.6% White, 0.8% African American, 0.6% Native American, 0.3% Asian, 0.8% from other races, and 1.9% from two or more races. Hispanic or Latino of any race were 1.1% of the population.

There were 341 households, of which 40.5% had children under the age of 18 living with them, 51.6% were married couples living together, 12.9% had a female householder with no husband present, 5.9% had a male householder with no wife present, and 29.6% were non-families. 25.8% of all households were made up of individuals, and 10.3% had someone living alone who was 65 years of age or older. The average household size was 2.58 and the average family size was 3.11.

The median age in the city was 32.2 years. 31.5% of residents were under the age of 18; 6.9% were between the ages of 18 and 24; 26.4% were from 25 to 44; 22.7% were from 45 to 64; and 12.4% were 65 years of age or older. The gender makeup of the city was 48.9% male and 51.1% female.

2000 census
As of the census of 2000, there were 868 people, 326 households, and 246 families living in the city. The racial makeup of the city was 97.24% White, 0.23% African American, 0.92% Native American, 0.12% Asian, and 1.50% from two or more races. Hispanic or Latino of any race were 0.92% of the population.

There were 326 households, out of which 39.9% had children under the age of 18 living with them, 61.7% were married couples living together, 9.2% had a female householder with no husband present, and 24.5% were non-families. 20.2% of all households were made up of individuals, and 8.9% had someone living alone who was 65 years of age or older. The average household size was 2.66 and the average family size was 3.07.

In the city, the population was spread out, with 29.6% under the age of 18, 9.4% from 18 to 24, 32.4% from 25 to 44, 17.5% from 45 to 64, and 11.1% who were 65 years of age or older. The median age was 32 years. For every 100 females, there were 94.2 males. For every 100 females age 18 and over, there were 92.7 males.

The median income for a household in the city was $40,865, and the median income for a family was $44,063. Males had a median income of $36,100 versus $22,273 for females. The per capita income for the city was $17,012. About 4.7% of families and 7.1% of the population were below the poverty line, including 9.1% of those under age 18 and 16.7% of those age 65 or over.

Education
Unified School District 342 administers the elementary, middle and high schools on one campus.  The buildings are attached and share some facilities.  The district offers special education for 3 and 4 year olds, a 4year old at risk program, and kindergarten through 12th grade. McLouth High School offers dual credit courses with Kansas community colleges.
In the 2014–2015 school year, there were 243 students in the elementary school, 115 students in the middle school and 171 students in the high school.  The average dropout rate for 2008-2014 was 0.9%.

References

External links
 City of McLouth
 McLouth - Directory of Public Officials
 USD 342, local school district
 McLouth City Map, KDOT

Cities in Kansas
Cities in Jefferson County, Kansas
Topeka metropolitan area, Kansas